Suzanne Clément (born 12 May 1969) is a Canadian actress. She is known for her work in Xavier Dolan's arthouse films I Killed My Mother (2009), Laurence Anyways (2012), and Mommy (2014).

With Emilie DeQuenne, she shared the Un Certain Regard Award for Best Actress at the 2012 Cannes Film Festival for her starring role in Laurence Anyways. She was also nominated for Best Actress at the 1st Canadian Screen Awards for the same performance.

Filmography

References

External links

1969 births
Actresses from Montreal
Canadian film actresses
Canadian television actresses
Living people
20th-century Canadian actresses
21st-century Canadian actresses
Best Supporting Actress Genie and Canadian Screen Award winners
Best Supporting Actress Jutra and Iris Award winners